Hans-Jörg Neumann was an East German luger who competed in the mid-1970s. He won two silver medals in the men's doubles event at the FIL World Luge Championships (1974, 1975).

Neumann also won a silver medal in the men's doubles event at the 1975 FIL European Luge Championships in Olang, Italy.

References
Hickok sports information on World champions in luge and skeleton.
List of European luge champions 
SportQuick.com information on World champions in luge 

German male lugers
Possibly living people
Year of birth missing
20th-century German people